Mordor Macula  is the informal name for a large red area about  in diameter near the north pole of Charon, Pluto's largest moon. It is named after the black land called Mordor in J.R.R. Tolkien's The Lord of the Rings.

Origin
The origin of Mordor Macula is not completely understood. It may be a deposit of frozen gases captured from Pluto's escaping atmosphere, a large impact basin, or both. A leading hypothesis is that nitrogen and methane escape from Pluto and are then deposited into the cold poles of Charon, where scattered ultraviolet light then transforms the molecules into tholins. This hypothesis implies that a similar red spot should exist on Charon's south pole as welland indirect evidence suggests this is true.

See also
 List of geological features on Charon

References

Surface features of Charon
Extraterrestrial surface features named for Middle-earth